Hindgut fermentation is a digestive process seen in monogastric herbivores, animals with a simple, single-chambered stomach.   Cellulose is digested with the aid of symbiotic bacteria. The microbial fermentation occurs in the digestive organs that follow the small intestine: the large intestine and cecum.  Examples of hindgut fermenters include proboscideans and large odd-toed ungulates such as horses and rhinos, as well as small animals such as rodents, rabbits and koalas. In contrast, foregut fermentation is the form of cellulose digestion seen in ruminants such as cattle which have a four-chambered stomach, as well as in sloths, macropodids, some monkeys, and one bird, the hoatzin.

Cecum
Hindgut fermenters generally have a cecum and large intestine that are much larger and more complex than those of a foregut or midgut fermenter. Research on small cecum fermenters such as flying squirrels, rabbits and lemurs has revealed these mammals to have a GI tract about 10-13 times the length of their body.  This is due to the high intake of fiber and other hard to digest compounds that are characteristic to the diet of monogastric herbivores. Unlike in foregut fermenters, the cecum is located after the stomach and small intestine in monogastric animals, which limits the amount of further digestion or absorption that can occur after the food is fermented.

Large intestine
In smaller hindgut fermenters of the order Lagomorpha (rabbits, hares, and pikas), cecotropes formed in the cecum are passed through the large intestine and subsequently reingested to allow another opportunity to absorb nutrients. Cecotropes are surrounded by a layer of mucus which protects them from stomach acid but which does not inhibit nutrient absorption in the small intestine. Coprophagy is also practiced by some rodents, such as the capybara, guinea pig and related species, and by the marsupial common ringtail possum. This process is also beneficial in allowing for restoration of the microflora population, or gut flora. These microbes are found in the digestive organs of living creatures and can act as protective agents that strengthen the immune system. Hindgut fermenters do have the ability to expel their microflora, which is useful during the acts of hibernation, estivation and torpor.

Efficiency
While foregut fermentation is generally considered more efficient, and monogastric animals cannot digest cellulose as efficiently as ruminants, hindgut fermentation allows animals to consume small amounts of low-quality forage all day long and thus survive in conditions where ruminants might not be able to obtain nutrition adequate for their needs. Hindgut fermenters are able to extract more nutrition out of small quantities of feed.  The large hind-gut fermenters are bulk feeders: they ingest large quantities of low-nutrient food, which they process more rapidly than would be possible for a similarly sized foregut fermenter. The main food in that category is grass, and grassland grazers move over long distances to take advantage of the growth phases of grass in different regions.

Speed
The ability to process food more rapidly than foregut fermenters gives hindgut fermenters an advantage at very large body size, as they are able to accommodate significantly larger food intakes. The largest extant and prehistoric megaherbivores, elephants and indricotheres (a type of rhino), respectively, have been hindgut fermenters. Study of the rates of evolution of larger maximum body mass in different terrestrial mammalian groups has shown that the fastest growth in body mass over time occurred in hindgut fermenters (perissodactyls, rodents  and proboscids).

Types
Hindgut fermenters are subdivided into two groups based on the relative size of various digestive organs in relationship to the rest of the system: colonic fermenters tend to be larger species such as horses, and cecal fermenters are smaller animals such as rabbits and rodents. However, in spite of the terminology, colonic fermenters such as horses make extensive use of the cecum to break down cellulose. Also, colonic fermenters typically have a proportionally longer large intestine than small intestine, whereas cecal fermenters have a considerably enlarged cecum compared to the rest of the digestive tract.

Insects
In addition to mammals, several insects are also hindgut fermenters, the best studied of which are the termites, which are characterised by an enlarged "paunch" of the hindgut that also houses the bulk of the gut microbiota. Digestion of wood particles in lower termites is accomplished inside the phagosomes of gut flagellates, but in the flagellate-free higher termites, this appears to be accomplished by fibre-associated bacteria.

See also
 Foregut fermentation
 Pseudoruminants
 Ruminants

References

Digestive system
Biology terminology